Harry Smoler (November 8, 1911 – June 12, 1991) was an American politician who served in the New York State Assembly from the 42nd district from 1979 to 1982.

He died of heart disease on June 12, 1991, in Brooklyn, New York City, New York at age 79.

References

1911 births
1991 deaths
Democratic Party members of the New York State Assembly
20th-century American politicians
Politicians from Brooklyn